Takabe is a Japanese surname. Notable people with the surname include:

, Japanese actress and voice actress
, Japanese footballer
, Japanese Go player

Japanese-language surnames